Black Slide is a 2021 Israeli/British animated short film directed by Uri Lotan. The 11-minute short has been presented in a number of film festivals, including the Annecy International Animated Film Festival and the Indy Shorts Film Festival. Black Slide also won the Audience award for Best Short Film at the 2022 British Animation Awards and is now qualified for the 95th Academy Awards in the eligible films under the category Best Animated Short Film.

Plot 

A young boy faces his deepest fears as he and his friend sneak into the scariest slide of the water park.

Reception 
Since its release, the film has been selected in various festivals around the world:

References

External links
 
 Official trailer on YouTube

2021 films
Israeli animated short films
2021 animated films
2021 short films
Israeli animated films
Films about fear